Kateřina Kováčová (born 16 July 1982) is a Czech poet. For her debut poetry collection, Hnízda, she  won the 2005 Jiří Orten Award given to the author of a work of prose or poetry who is no older than 30 at the time of the work's completion.

Life and career 
From 2001-2006, she studied Czech and English at the Pedagogical Faculty of JE Purkyně University in Ústí nad Labem.

Awards  
 2005 Jiří Orten Award

Bibliography 
Poetry
 Sem cejtila les.  Opava: Perplex, 2015. (9788087370155)
 Soumračno. Praha : Protis, 2007. (9788073860004)
 Hnízda. Ústí nad Labem : CKK sv. Vojtěcha, 2005.

Children's Books
 Byliny malé čarodějky. Praha: Slovart, 2015. (9788075290274)
 O Lucince a kouzelné lucerně. Praha : Junák - svaz skautů a skautek ČR, 2011. (9788086825601)

References 

1982 births
Living people
Czech women poets